Farhad Gurban oglu Khalilov (born 26 October 1946 in Baku) is a People's Artist of Azerbaijan, chairman of the Union of Artists of Azerbaijan.

Biography 
Farhad Khalilov was born on 26 October 1946 in Baku. In 1961–1966 he studied at Azerbaijan State Art School named after Azim Azimzade. He continued his education at Stroganov Art School in 1966–1968 and at Moscow Polygraphic Institute in 1969–1975.

F. Khalilov has been a member of Artists' Union of the USSR since 1989, and in 1987 he was elected chairman of the Union of Artists of Azerbaijan. He has been an honorary member of the Russian Academy of Arts since 2008.

Absheron motifs play an important role in the artist's work. Beaches and views of Absheron, as well as settlements of the Absheron Peninsula — Nardaran, Buzovna, Zagulba, Mashtaga, Mardakan and others are examples of this. His works have been repeatedly exhibited in the countries of the former USSR, Europe, as well as in various galleries and exhibitions.

Awards 
 Silver medal of the Russian Academy of Arts — 1987
 Honored Artist of the Azerbaijan SSR — 7 May 1988
 Ordre des Arts et des Lettres — 2000
 Medal of Pushkin — 2000
 People's Artist of Azerbaijan Republic — 30 May 2002
 Shohrat Order — 25 October 2006
 Gold medal of the Russian Academy of Arts — 2012
 Sharaf Order — 25 October 2016
 "Star of the Union" award of the Commonwealth of Independent States — 2017

References

1946 births
Artists from Baku
Azerbaijani painters
Living people
Recipients of the Shohrat Order
Stroganov Moscow State Academy of Arts and Industry alumni